Sounds Eclectic: The Covers Project is a compilation album consisting of cover songs performed by a variety of artists on KCRW. The recordings come from "Sounds Eclectic", a weekly syndicated public radio program hosted by Nic Harcourt that plays a variety of music, taken from the archives of the daily KCRW program Morning Becomes Eclectic. One exception is The Flaming Lips' performance of Radiohead's "Knives Out", which was recorded in their tour bus on the way to the studio. The album was sold exclusively at select Starbucks locations (Los Angeles, New York City, San Francisco, San Diego, Austin, Boston, and Washington, D.C.) starting March 13, 2007. A portion of sales helped the station's effort to digitize its music library.

Track listing

Personnel

John Baggot – keyboards
Teddy Borowiecki – piano, accordion
Andy Brohard – assistant engineer
Heather Brown – backing vocals
Chris Bruce – guitar (acoustic), bass
Peter Buck – guitar, mandolin
Denyse Buffman – viola
Jamie Candiloro – engineer
Larry Corbett – cello
Nikka Costa – vocals
Wayne Coyne – guitar (acoustic), vocals
Steve Cradock – guitar
Ryan Cross – cello
Josh Cunningham – guitar (acoustic)
Shawn Davis – bass
Vinicius Felix de Miranda – guitar
Joel Derouin – fiddle, violin
Mario Diaz – engineer, editing
Dido – vocals
Craig Doubet – engineer
Steven Drozd –guitar, keyboards, vocals
Brandon Duncan – engineer
Charles Floyd – conductor
Danny Frankel – drums
Sia – vocals
Angela Gannon – percussion, vocals, melodica
Sean Gannon – drums
Adam Grace – keyboards
Ray Guarna – engineer
Lisa Hannigan – vocals
Nic Harcourt – producer, liner notes

Missy Higgins – guitar, piano, vocals
Daniel Huffman – keyboards
Michael Ivins – bass, keyboards
Gary Jules – guitar (acoustic), vocals
Greg Kurstin – keyboards
k.d. lang – vocals
Mark LeCorre – engineer
Greg Leisz – guitar
Joshua "Trumpet Solo" Lopez – guitar, backing vocals
Adam MacDougall – keyboards, backing vocals
Ed Maxwell – bass
Ariana Morgenstern – producer
Jared Nugent – assistant engineer
David Palmer – keyboards
David Piltch – bass
Robert Plant – vocals
Damien Rice – guitar, vocals
Michelle Richards – violin
Marcelino Sanchez – intern
Jacob Sciba – assistant engineer
Al Sgro – percussion, backing vocals
Chris Stills – guitar, vocals
Michael Stipe – vocals
Romeo Stodart – guitar, piano, vocals
Skin Tyson – guitar
Rufus Wainwright – guitar, piano, vocals
Matt Ward – guitar, harmonica, piano, vocals
Joey Waronker – drums
Paul John Weller – guitar, vocals
Jason Wormer – engineer

References

2007 compilation albums
Covers albums
Hear Music compilation albums